William Scott (23 March 1884 – 8 December 1931) was an English long-distance runner who competed at the 1912 Summer Olympics. He reached the finals of individual 10,000 m and cross-country races, but failed to complete them, partly due to a strong heat.

Scott won the Amateur Athletic Association title over 10 miles in 1911 and 1912, and finished second in the national cross-country championship in 1911. He competed for England in the International Cross Country Championships in 1910–13.

References

External links
 

1884 births
1931 deaths
English male long-distance runners
Olympic athletes of Great Britain
Athletes (track and field) at the 1912 Summer Olympics
Olympic cross country runners